Dan Brodsky-Chenfeld or Dan BC is a six-time world champion skydiver and a motivational speaker.

In 1992, Brodsky-Chenfeld survived a plane crash that killed 16 people, including several other members of his skydiving team. He spent six weeks in a coma, with major injuries including a broken neck. 

In 1994, he co-founded Arizona Airspeed, a skydiving team based at Skydive Arizona. Brodsky-Chenfeld led Airspeed four- and eight-person formation skydiving teams to six World Championships.  Brodsky-Chenfeld is also a large formation skydiving world record holder. He has made over 30,000 skydives.

Brodsky-Chenfeld was inducted into the Skydiving Museum and Hall of Fame in 2014.

Brodsky-Chenfeld published the memoir: Above All Else: A World Champion Skydiver's Story of Survival and What It Taught Him About Fear, Adversity, and Success. He also did a TED Talk related to his memoir.

References

External links

 
 Dan BC's Ted Talk

American skydivers
Year of birth missing (living people)
Living people